David De La Mora Zambrano (born 3 June 1989) is a Mexican professional boxer who twice challenged for the WBA bantamweight title in 2011 and 2012.

Early life
After qualifying as a dental technician, De La Mora is currently majoring in media studies at the University Center of Tijuana.

Professional career
De La Mora is managed by Antonio Lozada Sr. of Baja Boxing and trains under Romulo Quirarte's guidance.

In April 2010, De La Mora beat veteran Jovanny Soto by T.K.O. to win the WBC FECARBOX Bantamweight Championship. The bout was the main-event of a Televisa boxing card at the Palenque of Morelos Park in Tijuana.

WBA Bantamweight Championship
De La Mora fought against Kōki Kameda for the WBA Bantamweight Championship in front of 9,500 spectators (announced by the organizer) at the Nippon Budokan in Tokyo on August 31, 2011. He opened a cut above Kameda's left eye with his right cross in the third round, but was knocked down once in the same round. As a result, he lost via a unanimous decision on the judges' scorecards. The three judges' scores were 113–114, 113–115 and 112–115.

This card was staged by Kameda Promotions whose president is Kōki Kameda himself, as the TBS televised co-main event to Hugo Cázares vs. Tomonobu Shimizu. Antonio Lozada Sr. protested the decisions of the judges of those two title bouts, especially Kameda vs. De La Mora, and stated he would send a letter to the WBA.

WBA Super Bantamweight Championship
De La Mora and his team had been eager for a second world title shot against Kameda or other champions, and he earned the opportunity to fight for the WBA Super World Bantamweight Title against Anselmo Moreno in the Showtime-televised co-main event at the Don Haskins Center on April 21, 2012. Lozada Sr. mentioned that De La Mora grew up in all aspects after the Kameda fight and that he would conquer a tricky championship.

Mora vs. Isawa
On December 27, David De La Mora faced off against Ryosuke Isawa. Isawa won by unanimous decision in the 10th round with all judges scorecards with 100-90. This was a non-title fight. This was De La Mora's first time losing 2 times in a row.

References

External links

Boxers from Baja California
Sportspeople from Tijuana
Bantamweight boxers
1989 births
Living people
Mexican male boxers